The men's light welterweight (63 kg/138.6 lbs) Full-Contact category at the W.A.K.O. European Championships 2004 in Budva was the fifth lightest of the male Full-Contact tournaments and involved thirteen participants.  Each of the matches was three rounds of two minutes each and were fought under Full-Contact kickboxing rules.

As there were too few places for a tournament designed for sixteen, three of the fighters received byes through to the quarter final stage.  The light welterweight gold medal was won by France's Malik Mangouchi who defeated Russia's Vladimir Pykhtin by split decision.  It was Malik's second gold at a W.A.K.O. championships with his previous winners medal coming at the 2001 championships in Belgrade.  The bronze medal positions were taken by Robert Zytkiewicz and Biagio Tralli from Poland and Italy respectively.

Results

Key

See also
List of WAKO Amateur European Championships
List of WAKO Amateur World Championships
List of male kickboxers

References

External links
 WAKO World Association of Kickboxing Organizations Official Site

W.A.K.O. European Championships 2004 (Budva)